Aa lehmannii is a species of orchid in the genus Aa. It is native to Ecuador.

References

lehmannii
Plants described in 2014